Rubus arvensis, the field blackberry, is an uncommon North American species of flowering plant in the rose family. It is found in scattered locations in the southeastern and south-central United States (from eastern Texas to the Carolinas, with isolated populations in Kentucky).

The genetics of Rubus is extremely complex, so that it is difficult to decide on which groups should be recognized as species. There are many rare species with limited ranges such as this. Further study is suggested to clarify the taxonomy.

References

External links
photo of herbarium specimen at Missouri Botanical Garden

arvensis
Plants described in 1914
Flora of the United States